Cercospora liquidambaris is a fungal plant pathogen.

References

liquidambaris
Fungal plant pathogens and diseases